XHUNAM-TDT is a low-power digital television station operating on channel 20 in Mexico City, owned by and broadcasting from the campus of the National Autonomous University of Mexico''' (UNAM).

History
XHUNAM began broadcasts on analog channel 60 on December 5, 2000, where it broadcast for five years. On November 30, 2005, however, XHUNAM launched its digital signal, one of the first in the country and also one of the first digital-only stations in Mexico.

Although the National Autonomous University of Mexico (UNAM) operates the tv•unam network since 2005, the programming on XHUNAM is completely different from said network; it consists merely of old concerts conducted by Herbert von Karajan, looping all-day long, weekdays only, generally from 7:00 a.m. to 11:30 p.m. as a signal test. TV UNAM instead depends on SPR transmitters, including XHSPR-TDT in Mexico City, for broadcast coverage.

Initially broadcasting with an effective radiated power of 200 watts, XHUNAM generally covered only the greater UNAM area in Mexico City. A power increase to 1,500 watts was approved in 2017 and extends the signal reach beyond the immediate campus to other parts of western and southwestern Mexico City.

References

Television stations in Mexico City
National Autonomous University of Mexico
Public television in Mexico
Spanish-language television stations in Mexico
Television channels and stations established in 2000
2000 establishments in Mexico